Andrew Peter Sutton (born 29 November 1985) is an English former cricketer who played as a right arm medium-fast bowler and right-handed batsman for Somerset, Herefordshire and Wiltshire. He joined Somerset after impressing for Gloucestershire Second XI in a match against Somerset Second XI in May 2007 and was awarded a one-year contract for the 2008 season, at the end of which he was released without having made a first-team appearance. However, he later appeared for Somerset against Cardiff MCC University in what turned out to be his only first-class match from 31 March to 2 April 2012. He took a wicket in each innings and did not bat.

References

External links

1985 births
Living people
Sportspeople from Worcester, England
English cricketers
Herefordshire cricketers
Somerset cricketers
Wiltshire cricketers